Chicago farmers' markets include approximately 30 open-air markets across neighborhoods with farmers from Illinois, and surrounding states including Indiana, Michigan and Wisconsin. 

Most of the markets are sponsored by the city and are held on one day of the week, with the exception of a few of the more popular ones, such as the Green City Market. Each market is open from 7:00 a.m. to 2:00 p.m., unless otherwise indicated. Over time the locations and days of some markets have shifted as the city re-balances coverage to different neighborhoods throughout the week. Most markets begin on the first week of the month listed, but a few begin in the second week of the month.

Chicago City Markets sell fresh seasonal produce, flowers, prepared foods, unique Chicago-made products and rare finds – at Chicago’s longest-running farmers market on Daley Plaza, the historic Maxwell Street Market and community markets in neighborhoods across Chicago.

References 

Farmers' markets
Farmers' markets
Farmers' markets in the United States
Farmers' markets, Chicago